WSN or Wireless sensor network, are spatially distributed autonomous sensors that monitor physical or environmental conditions and pass their data through the network to a main location.

WSN may also refer to:

 WSN Environmental Solutions, an Australian waste disposal company
 South Naknek Airport, Alaska (IATA airport code)
 Washington Square News, the daily student newspaper of New York University
 White sponge nevus, an autosomal dominant skin condition
 Wirth syntax notation, a metasyntax, or formal way to describe formal languages
 World Sports Network (WSN.com), a sports betting website run by Gaming Innovation Group